Muhammad Yaqub Nanautawi (1833–1884) was an Indian Islamic scholar, and one of the earliest teachers of Islamic Madrassa in Deoband, famously called Darul Uloom Deoband in India. He was the first principal of Darul Uloom Deoband.

Name and lineage
His ism (given name) was Muhammad Yaqub. His nasab (patronymic) is: Muhammad Yaqub ibn Mamluk Ali ibn Ahmad Ali ibn Ghulam Sharaf ibn Abdullah ibn Abd al-Fath ibn Muhammad Mu'in ibn Abd al-Sami ibn Muhammad Hashim ibn Shah Muhammad ibn Qadhi Taha ibn Mubarak ibn Amanullah ibn Jamaluddin ibn Qadhi Meeran ibn Mazharuddin ibn Najmuddin Saani ibn Nuruddin Rab'i ibn Qiyamuddin ibn Ziya-ud-din ibn Nuruddin Salis ibn Najmuddin ibn Nuruddin Saani ibn Ruknuddin ibn Rafi-ud-Din ibn Baha'uddin ibn Shihabuddin ibn Khwaja Yusuf ibn Khalil ibn Sadruddin ibn Ruknuddin Samarqandi ibn Sadruddin al-Haaj ibn Ismaeel ash-Shaheed ibn Nuruddin al-Qitaal ibn Mahmood ibn Baha-ud-din ibn Abdullah ibn Zakariyyah ibn Nur ibn Sirah ibn Shadi as-Siddiqi ibn Waheeduddin ibn Masood ibn Abd al-Razaq ibn Qasim ibn Muhammad ibn Abu Bakr.

Early life and education
Muhammad Yaqub was born in 1833, coinciding 13 Safar 1249 AH in British India, in the town of Nanauta, part of the Saharanpur District of the modern province of Uttar Pradesh, India. His father, Mamluk Ali, was one of the senior Muslim scholars of India at the time, and the head of Oriental Studies at Madrassa Gaziuddin Khan. Muhammad Yaqub studied most of the Islamic sciences under his father and Shah Abd al-Ghani Mujaddidi. His other teachers include Ahmad Ali Saharanpuri.

Muhammad Yaqub was trained in tasawwuf under Haji Imdadullah and received khilafah (authorization) from him in the Chishti, Naqshbandi, Qadiri, and Suhrawardi orders.

Career
In 1852, Muhammad Yaqub was appointed as a teacher in Government College Ajmer. At the recommendation of the College principal, he was offered the post of Deputy collector, which he rejected. He was transferred to Banaras, and later promoted to the post of Deputy Inspector, Saharanpur.

In 1866, Muhammad Yaqub was appointed as the principal of Darul Uloom Deoband. Concerning his appointment in the Deoband seminary, Muhammad Miyan Deobandi writes that, "Seeing the increase in students day to day, it became a concern to get good teachers and thus Maulana Muhammad Yaqub was called to be the principal who was then teaching either in Ajmer or somewhere else."

Students of Muhammad Yaqub include most of the second-generation Islamic scholars such as Mahmud Hasan Deobandi, Aziz-ur-Rahman Usmani, Sayyid Mumtaz Ali, Hafiz Muhammad Ahmad, Khalil Ahmad Saharanpuri and Ashraf Ali Thanwi.

Death and legacy
Muhammad Yaqub Nanautavi died of cholera at age 51 in 1884 and was buried in his hometown, Nanauta.

Family life
Muhammad Yaqub was maternal uncle of the Hadith scholar Khalil Ahmad Saharanpuri.

References

1833 births
1884 deaths
Deobandis
Indian Sunni Muslim scholars of Islam
19th-century Muslim scholars of Islam
People from British India
Academic staff of Darul Uloom Deoband
People from Nanauta